Justice Dorab Framrose Patel (b. 1924  – d.15 March 1997), was a Pakistan jurist of Parsi descent, and lawmaker who served as a former Justice of the Supreme Court of Pakistan and former Chief Justice of the Sindh High Court. Justice Patel was a prominent campaigner for human rights, and was a founding member of the Asian Human Rights Commission (AHRC) in 1987 and the co-founder of the Human Rights Commission of Pakistan.

A Parsi by faith, he rose up the ranks of the judiciary to become one of Pakistan's most senior most judges, only to resign on principle after refusing to take an oath of allegiance to Chief Martial Law Administrator and Chief of Army Staff at that time, General Zia-ul-Haq in 1981. Justice Patel died of leukaemia on 1997 in Islamabad, and was buried in Karachi.

Early life 
He attended various boarding schools before attending Bombay University in 1942. In 1944, Patel graduated with an LL.B. in Law and Justice from Bombay University. In 1945, Patel moved to Karachi where he began his legal practice in the Sindh High Court. In 1946, Patel went to the United Kingdom and attended the London School of Economics. In 1948, Patel received an MSc in Economics, followed by an LLM in Law and Justice Development in 1949. He wrote his master's thesis on the Pakistan economy and the legal system in Pakistan. In 1950, he was called to the bar from Lincoln's Inn where he was awarded BPTC in 1953. Following the completion of his doctorate, Patel returned to Karachi, West Pakistan where he began practising law in the West Pakistan High Court.

Judicial career 
He was elected secretary of the High Court Bar in 1964 and was raised to the bench of the then West Pakistan High Court in 1967. Justice Patel was elevated to the Supreme Court on 7 January 1976.

On 24 March 1981, General Zia ul Haq issued a Provisional Constitutional Order (PCO) and asked the Justices of the High Courts and Supreme Court to take oath on it. Justice Patel refused to take oath and resigned. Had Justice Patel not resigned, he would have become the Chief Justice of the Supreme Court. After his resignation from the Supreme Court, he devoted the rest of his life to waging a crusade for the rights of the oppressed and downtrodden. In 1990, he became the second Pakistani to be elected a member of the exclusive International Commission of Jurists (ICJ).

Important decisions
 Justice Patel was in the minority in a split decision of 4–3 that upheld the decision of Lahore High Court that handed down the death penalty to former Prime Minister Zulfikar Ali Bhutto.

Publications
 1989, Military Dictatorship in Pakistan and the role of Judges (in English and Urdu), by Dorab Patel.
 1964, Testaments of Liberals: Jinnah Papers (in English only), by Dorab Patel

References

External links 
  PAKISTAN: Dorab Patel’s Second by Beena Sarwar 

Lawyers from Karachi
Pakistani lawyers
Pakistani judges
Alumni of the London School of Economics
Alumni of the Inns of Court School of Law
Members of Lincoln's Inn
Pakistani Zoroastrians
Parsi people
1924 births
1997 deaths
20th-century Pakistani lawyers